Dăneşti may refer to:

 Dănești, Gorj, a commune in Gorj County, Romania
 Dănești, Harghita, a commune in Harghita County, Romania
 Dănești, Vaslui, a commune in Vaslui County, Romania
 Dăneşti, a village in Frăsinet Commune, Călăraşi County, Romania
 Dăneşti, a village in Şişeşti Commune, Maramureș County, Romania
 Dăneşti, a village in Girov Commune, Neamţ County, Romania
 House of Dănești

See also 
 Dănulești (disambiguation)